Miar Kola (also Romanized as Mīār Kolā) is a village in Mazkureh Rural District, in the Central District of Sari County, Mazandaran Province, Iran. At the 2006 census, its population was 1,458, in 405 families.

References 

Populated places in Sari County